MV Mark W. Barker is a large diesel-powered lake freighter owned and operated by the Interlake Steamship Company. She is the first of the s constructed for an American shipping company. MV Mark W. Barker is the first ship on the Great Lakes to be powered with engines that meet EPA Tier 4 standards.

Description 
The vessel was built by Fincantieri Bay Shipbuilding at Sturgeon Bay, Wisconsin. Construction began in mid-2019. Her self-unloader was 's boom that was taken off before the ship was scrapped.
She is designed to carry bulk cargo such as taconite, salt, or limestone, as well as other loads like wind turbine blades. MV Mark W. Barker is powered by two , 16-cylinder EMD diesel engines. In operation, she is designed for a complement of 16–17 crew.

Service history 
Launched in spring 2022, she became the first new American-built lake freighter since 1983, as well as Interlake's first American-built bulk freighter since 1981. The ship underwent sea trials in June and July 2022, sailing under her own power for the first time on July 1, 2022. On July 27, 2022, MV Mark W. Barker began her maiden voyage to Port Inland, Michigan to load stone for Muskegon, Michigan, thus entering regular service. She was christened on September 1, 2022, in Cleveland, Ohio.

External links
 Official MV Mark. W Barker Webpage

References 

2022 ships
Great Lakes freighters
Ships built in Sturgeon Bay, Wisconsin
Fincantieri